Royal Consort Gyeongmok of the Gaeseong Wang clan was a Goryeo queen consort as the first wife of King Deokjong and became the first Goryeo queen who didn't receive any Posthumous name like the other one.

Biography

Early life and background
She was born as the daughter Yi Ja-rim (이자림) and Princess Consort Gaeseong of the Gim clan (개성군부인 김씨) into the Cheongju Yi clan, also the younger sister of Consort Wonjil, Hyeonjong of Goryeo's 9th wife.

Yi Ja-rim made achievements such as suppressing the rebellion and building Naseong in Gaegyeong, which was destroyed during Goryeo–Khitan War by the Liao Dynasty, later was given surname "Wang" (왕, 王) by King Hyeonjong with the name as "Ga-do" (가도). However, in 1033 (the 2nd year of King Deokjong), when Ga-do's tough policy against the Khitan was rejected by other officials, Wang then retired from politics, and her position was shaken.

Palace life
On 7 October 1031, she become Deokjong's queen consort and honoured as Consort Hyeon (현비, 賢妃), then bore him 1 daughter. Although Wang was Deokjong's first wife and queen consort, but later in 1034, Deokjong lifted Hyeonjong of Goryeo's daughter, Queen Gyeongseong as his 2nd wife and new queen consort. In the same year, Wang Ga-do died and Deokjong died not long after his death.

References

External links
Royal Consort Gyeongmok on Encykorea .
Royal Consort Gyeongmok on Busan Ilbo .

Royal consorts of the Goryeo Dynasty
Korean queens consort
Year of death unknown
Year of birth unknown